This is the discography of Japanese singer and songwriter Aiko. All of Aiko's songs are distributed by Japanese media company Pony Canyon.

Albums

Studio albums

Compilation albums

Independent albums

Singles

References

External links

Discographies of Japanese artists
Pop music discographies